Claude Coleman Jr. is an American musician, best known as the drummer for the alternative rock group Ween. He has also worked with Eagles of Death Metal, Chocolate Genius, the Wooden Soldiers, Elysian Fields and 3 Input Woman. As well as being a touring member of the Mike Dillon Band on multiple occasions.

A multi-instrumentalist, Coleman is also the singer/songwriter for his own group Amandla. In 2006, he released his second album as Amandla, titled The Full Catastrophe.

Coleman survived a near-fatal car accident on August 7, 2002, in which he suffered multiple pelvic fractures and brain injuries. During his extensive and difficult recovery, members of Ween organized a series of benefit concerts on October 7 and 8, 2002, hosted at New York's Bowery Ballroom. Josh Freese performed with Ween in Coleman's place. Coleman eventually recovered, and remained an active member of Ween until their dissolution in 2012 and since their reunion in 2016

Coleman is also active in music education through the Paul Green School of Rock, and through the New York City music program Music Ascension.

Since 2017, he has co-owned and actively managed SoundSpace@Rabbit's, a music rehearsal and art studio facility inside of a 1947 Black-owned tourist court and soul food café known as Rabbit's Motel, in the historically African-American district of Southside, Asheville, North Carolina.

Coleman endorses Aquarian drumheads, Bosphorus cymbals, and Vater drumsticks.

A resident of Maplewood, New Jersey, he is a graduate of Columbia High School in Maplewood.

Discography 
Main articles: Ween discography

With Amandla

 Falling Alone (2001)
 The Full Catastrophe (2006)
 Laughing Hearts (2018)

References 

Living people
African-American drummers
American rock drummers
American male singers
American rock singers
American indie rock musicians
Ween members
Eagles of Death Metal members
Columbia High School (New Jersey) alumni
People from Maplewood, New Jersey
Musicians from New Jersey
Year of birth missing (living people)